Christian Moueix (born 1946) is a French winemaker and the president of the négociant house Établissements Jean-Pierre Moueix in Libourne, overseeing production in several estates in Saint-Émilion and Pomerol including Château La Fleur-Pétrus and Château Trotanoy. He has managed the company since his father Jean-Pierre Moueix stepped down in 1991.

Early life
Christian Moueix was born in 1946, the son of Jean-Pierre Moueix.

Career
Moueix also owns Dominus Estate in Napa Valley, California. Upon a recommendation by Robert Mondavi to establish production in Napa Valley, Moueix entered into a partnership with Robin Lail and Marcia Smith in 1982 on the historic Napanook Vineyards estate and became the sole owner of the property in 1995.

In 2008, Moueix was chosen the "Man of the Year" by the wine magazine Decanter.

Personal life
Moueix is married to Cherise. He has two children from a previous marriage, Edouard, who has worked for JPM since about 2005, and Charlotte, a wildlife vet in South Africa.

Art collectors
Moueix and his wife Cherise are well-known art collectors. In 2014, she sold Mark Rothko's No. 6 (Violet, Green and Red) to Yves Bouvier through an intermediary for $80 million plus an unspecified commission, which Bouvier then sold to Dmitry Rybolovlev for €140 million.

See also
List of wine personalities

References

External links
Moueix.com
Dominusestate.com
Ulyssesvineyard.com

1946 births
Living people
French art collectors
French winemakers
University of California, Davis alumni